David Allen Walker (born January 16, 1952 in Charleston, West Virginia) is an American politician and  was a Democratic member of the West Virginia House of Delegates representing District 33 since January 2009.

Education
Walker graduated from Herbert Hoover High School.

Elections
2012 Walker was challenged for the May 8, 2012 Democratic Primary but won with 2,028 votes (61.1%), and was unopposed for the November 6, 2012 General election, winning with 4,575 votes.
1996 Walker ran in the District 33 1996 Democratic Primary, but lost to Bill Stemple, who went on to win the November 5, 1996 General election.
1998 Walker challenged incumbent Representative Stemple in the four-way 1998 Democratic Primary but lost to Representative Stemple, who was unopposed for the November 3, 1998 General election.
2000 Walker placed in the three-way 2000 Democratic Primary but again lost to Representative Stemple, who won the November 7, 2000 General election against Republican nominee Ben Murphy.
2008 When District 33 Democratic Representative Stemple retired and left the seat open, Walker ran in the five-way May 13, 2008 Democratic Primary and placed first by 37 votes with 1,238 votes (30.6%), and won the November 4, 2008 General election with 3,635 votes (67.9%) against Republican nominee Larry Cole.
2010 Walker was challenged in the May 11, 2010 Democratic Primary and won with 1,644 votes (57.7%), and was unopposed for the November 2, 2010 General election, winning with 3,225 votes.

References

External links
Official page at the West Virginia Legislature

David Walker at Ballotpedia
David Walker at OpenSecrets

1952 births
Living people
Democratic Party members of the West Virginia House of Delegates
Politicians from Charleston, West Virginia
People from Clendenin, West Virginia